Brants's climbing mouse (Dendromus mesomelas) is a species of rodent in the family Nesomyidae.
It is found in Botswana, Democratic Republic of the Congo, Kenya, Malawi, Mozambique, Namibia, South Africa, Tanzania, and Zambia.
Its natural habitats are subtropical or tropical moist montane forests, dry savanna, Mediterranean-type shrubby vegetation, and subtropical or tropical high-altitude grassland.

References

Musser, G. G. and M. D. Carleton. 2005. Superfamily Muroidea. pp. 894–1531 in Mammal Species of the World a Taxonomic and Geographic Reference. D. E. Wilson and D. M. Reeder eds. Johns Hopkins University Press, Baltimore.

Dendromus
Rodents of Africa
Mammals described in 1827
Taxonomy articles created by Polbot